Mueang Ngai is a tambon (subdistrict) of Chiang Dao District, in Chiang Mai Province, Thailand. In 2020 it had a total population of 6,178 people.

Administration

Central administration
The tambon is subdivided into 11 administrative villages (muban).

Local administration
The area of the subdistrict is shared by 2 local governments.
the subdistrict municipality (Thesaban Tambon) Mueang Ngai (เทศบาลตำบลเมืองงาย)
the subdistrict municipality (Thesaban Tambon) Phra That Pu Kam (เทศบาลตำบลพระธาตุปู่ก่ำ)

References

External links
Thaitambon.com on Mueang Ngai

Tambon of Chiang Mai province
Populated places in Chiang Mai province